Overbye is a surname and may refer to the following individuals:

Dagmar Overbye (1883–1929), a Danish serial killer
Dennis Overbye (born 1944), a science writer specializing in physics and cosmology
Erik Overbye (born 1934), a Danish film producer
Marie Overbye (born 1976), an athlete from Denmark
Carsten Overbye (born 1970), a Danish tv photographer.

See also
Overby